Lords Never Worry (stylized as Lord$ Never Worry) is the debut mixtape by hip hop collective ASAP Mob. It was released as a free digital download on August 28, 2012, by ASAP Worldwide, Polo Grounds Music, and RCA Records. The mixtape contains verses from ASAP Mob group members ASAP Rocky, ASAP Twelvyy, ASAP Ant, ASAP Ferg, and ASAP Nast, along with guest appearances from Danny Brown, Raekwon, Flatbush Zombies, Gunplay, Dash, Fat Trel, Jim Jones and Bodega Bamz.  The album's production was provided by Clams Casino, ASAP Ty Beats, AraabMuzik and P On The Boards, among others.

The mixtape's music incorporates stylistic and production elements of various hip hop scenes, as was seen on Rocky's debut solo mixtape Live. Love. ASAP. Over the course of its 18 tracks, the mixtape incorporates Southern and "trap" hip hop beats containing rattling hi-hats and heavy bass.

Background
In 2012, it was initially announced that the group's mixtape was scheduled for a May 2012 release, to be followed by Rocky's debut album Long. Live. ASAP during the summer. However, after failing to be released during these months, Rocky announced in mid-July that the album would be released two weeks later. Again, however, the mixtape was not to be released and it was eventually announced that it would be released on August 28, 2012, via LiveMixtapes. The first single from their mixtape, called "Bath Salt", contains verses from Rocky and ASAP Ant, with guest features from Flatbush, New York-based hip hop group Flatbush Zombies. It was released at midnight on July 27, 2012. On August 13, 2012, a music video was released for a track called "Purple Kisses", followed by a music video for ASAP Ferg's track called "Work", one week later on August 20, 2012.

Reception

Critical response 

Upon its release, Lords Never Worry received generally negative reviews. Pitchfork Media's Jordan Sargent found ASAP Rocky and ASAP Ferg to be the highlights of the group, although he criticized the execution of the beats on the mixtape.

Track listing

Personnel 

 AraabMuzik - Producer
 ASAP Ant - Performer
 ASAP Ferg - Performer
 ASAP Nast - Performer
 ASAP Rocky - Executive producer (credited as Pretty Flacko), performer
 ASAP Twelvyy - Performer
 ASAP Ty Beats - Producer
 ASAP Yams - Executive producer (credited as Yamborghini)
 Benson Graves - Producer
 Bodega Bamz - Performer
 Carnage - Producer
 Chinza // Fly - Producer
 Clams Casino - Producer
 Danny Brown - Performer
 Dash - Performer

 Electro Beats - Producer
 E-Smitty - Producer
 Fat Trel - Performer
 Flatbush Zombies - Performer
 Gunplay - Performer
 Jim Jones - Performer
 Matthew Williams - Art direction, photography
 PAFMilo - Producer
 183rd - Producer
 P On The Boards - Producer
 Raekwon - Performer
 Ricky Saiz - Art direction, photography
 Silky Johnson - Producer
 Veryrvre - Producer

References 

2012 mixtape albums
ASAP Mob albums
RCA Records albums
Albums produced by AraabMuzik